Charalambos Papanikolaou (born 22 May 1969) is a Greek swimmer. He competed in four events at the 1988 Summer Olympics. He was named the 1985 Greek Male Athlete of the Year.

References

1969 births
Living people
Greek male swimmers
Olympic swimmers of Greece
Swimmers at the 1988 Summer Olympics
Place of birth missing (living people)
Mediterranean Games medalists in swimming
Mediterranean Games silver medalists for Greece
Mediterranean Games bronze medalists for Greece
Swimmers at the 1987 Mediterranean Games
20th-century Greek people